Maria Helena Pietilä-Holmner (born 25 July 1986) is a retired Swedish World Cup alpine ski racer. She specialised in the technical events of slalom and giant slalom.

Born in Umeå, Pietilä-Holmner took up alpine skiing at the age of seven. She was also a keen footballer, playing as a forward for Mariehem's girls' teams until the age of 15, when she decided to focus on skiing.  Pietilä-Holmner made her World Cup debut in Sölden at age 16 in October 2002. She won a gold medal at the 2006 World Junior Alpine Skiing Championships in the slalom. Her first World Cup win came at a slalom in Aspen in November 2010. She made a total of 207 World Cup starts, and took ten podiums, including three wins.

Pietilä-Holmner took five medals in the World Championships, two as an individual and three in the team events. She was the silver medalist in giant slalom in 2007 at Åre, Sweden. Four years later in 2011, she won 2 bronze medals at Garmish-Partenkirchen in the slalom and the team event. At Schladming in 2013, she won a silver in the team event. She took her final Worlds medal at the 2017 Championships, where she was part of the Swedish squad which finished third in the team event.

She made her debut at the Winter Olympics in 2006, where she finished tenth in the giant slalom. At the 2010 Winter Games, she finished fourth in the slalom, and at the 2014 Winter Olympics she was sixth in the giant slalom. She also won seven Swedish championship titles: five in slalom, one in giant slalom and one in combined.

On 17 January 2018, she announced her retirement from alpine skiing, following back problems. to instead become a Eurosport expert commentator.

She has been in a relationship with fellow alpine skier Hans Olsson since 2004: as of 2018 the couple were engaged. They both worked as part of the team covering alpine skiing at the 2018 Winter Olympics for Eurosport.

World Cup results

Season standings

Race podiums
 3 wins – (2 SL, 1 CE) 
 10 podiums – (7 SL, 1 GS, 2 PSL)

World Championship results

Olympic results

Video
Zapiks – post-race interview in November 2011 – 2nd place, Aspen slalom

References

External links

Maria Pietilae-Holmner World Cup standings at the International Ski Federation

Swedish Olympic Committee – Maria Pietilä Holmner – 
Rossignol.com – Maria Pietilä-Holmner – alpine skiing – Sweden
 – 

1986 births
Swedish female alpine skiers
Alpine skiers at the 2006 Winter Olympics
Alpine skiers at the 2010 Winter Olympics
Alpine skiers at the 2014 Winter Olympics
Olympic alpine skiers of Sweden
Swedish people of Finnish descent
Sportspeople from Umeå
Living people
21st-century Swedish women